N14 may refer to:

Roads
 N14 road (Belgium), a a national road in Belgium
 Route nationale 14, in France
 N14 road (Ireland)
 N14 expressway (Netherlands)
 N14 (South Africa)
 A14 motorway (Switzerland)
 Nebraska Highway 14, in the United States

Vehicles
 LNER Class N14, a class of British steam locomotives 
 Nissan Pulsar (N14), a Japanese automobile
 , a submarine of the Royal Navy

Other uses 
 N14 (Long Island bus)
 BMW N14, an automobile engine
 Flying W Airport in Burlington County, New Jersey, United States
 Nitrogen-14, an isotope of nitrogen
 N14, a postcode district in the N postcode area

See also
 14N (disambiguation)